The 2012 season of the Polish American Football League was the seventh season played by the american football leagues in Poland. In 2012, the Topliga was created as a major league with a bid (invitation) rule. Remaining teams was divided into two leagues (PLFA I and PLFA II) between which there is promotion and relegation. Both, PLFA I and PLFA II, was divided into two divisions, for the geographical reason.

Regular season of the Topliga took place between March 24 and June 17, 2012. The Polish champion was determined in the play-off final - the VII SuperFinal PLFA (known as the Polish Bowl VII). The Seahawks Gdynia beat the Warsaw Eagles in the championship game 52–37 hosted at the National Stadium in Warsaw.

Topliga

Results table

Standings

Postseason

PLFA I

Standings

Postseason

PLFA II

Standings

Postseason

See also
 2012 in sports

References

External links
 Polish American Football Association

Polish American Football League seasons
Poland
PLFA